Küstrin-Kietz is a small village located in the German state of Brandenburg, at the Oder river and the border with Poland. Since 1998 it has been part of the Küstriner Vorland municipality.

History
Before the implementation of the Oder-Neisse line in 1945, Kietz was the western suburb of the town of Küstrin. According to the Allied Potsdam Agreement, it then became part of the Soviet occupation zone, while the remaining city districts formed present-day Kostrzyn nad Odrą in Poland.

In 1954 the East German authorities made an attempt to rename the place Friedensfelde (literally: "fields of peace"), alluding to the Oder-Neisse line called "border of peace" in official usage. Ultimately the settlement retained its name Kietz, though without a mention of "Küstrin", which would have been considered revanchist by Communist officials. In a 1991 plebiscite the inhabitants voted for "Küstrin-Kietz".

Today Küstrin-Kietz is the site of a major Schengen border crossing, re-opened in 1992 on the Bundesstraße 1 and Droga krajowa No. 22 main road from Berlin to Gorzów Wielkopolski. The Oder bridge of the former Prussian Eastern Railway line was rebuilt after World War II; it is today in use by RegionalBahn trains connecting Kostrzyn with Berlin-Lichtenberg station.

See also
Kiez
Kostrzyn nad Odrą
Küstriner Vorland

External links

 A site on the history of Küstrin-Kietz
 Küstriner Vorland official site

Villages in Brandenburg
Localities in Märkisch-Oderland
Former municipalities in Brandenburg
Divided cities
Germany–Poland border crossings